International Transgender Day of Visibility (often referred to as TDOV or Trans Day of Visibility) is an annual event occurring on March 31 dedicated to celebrating transgender people and raising awareness of discrimination faced by transgender people worldwide, as well as a celebration of their contributions to society. The day was founded by transgender activist Rachel Crandall of Michigan in 2009 as a reaction to the lack of LGBTQ+ recognition of transgender people, citing the frustration that the only well-known transgender-centered day was the Transgender Day of Remembrance, which mourned the murders of transgender people, but did not acknowledge and celebrate living members of the transgender community. The first International Transgender Day of Visibility was held on March 31, 2009. It has since been spearheaded by the U.S.-based youth advocacy organization Trans Student Educational Resources.

Recognition
In 2014, the day was observed by activists across the world  including in Ireland and in Scotland.

Joe Biden officially proclaimed March 31, 2021, as a Transgender Day of Visibility, proclaiming in part, "I call upon all Americans to join in the fight for full equality for all transgender people." Biden was the first American president to issue a formal presidential proclamation recognizing the event. Biden issued a similar proclamation a year later, welcoming Jeopardy! contestant and transgender woman Amy Schneider to the White House and announcing a set of measures intended to support transgender rights.

Social media
In 2015, many transgender individuals participated in an online social media campaign on websites including Facebook, Twitter, Tumblr, and Instagram. Participants posted selfies, personal stories, and statistics regarding transgender issues and other related content to raise awareness and increase visibility.

Controversy
Since its inception, controversies have surrounded the holiday. In 2015, students at Marshall High School in West Virginia were accused of going against Christian beliefs by decorating a bulletin board for Transgender Visibility Day. In 2022 on the holiday, a protest in Kerala, India by transgender activists in response to alleged misconduct at a local bathing ghat. This incident resulted in a scuffle with police officers outside Aluva Police Station.

See also 
 Social invisibility
 Trans Day of Action
 Transgender rights movement
 Transgender history
 Trans March
 National Trans Visibility March
 Transgender Day of Remembrance
 Transgender flag

References

Further reading 
 International Transgender Day of Visibility // The SAGE Encyclopedia of Trans Studies, p. 443—447

External links 

 Transgender Day of Visibility on the GLAAD website
 Transgender Day of Visibility on the GLSEN website

March observances
Civil awareness days
Transgender events
Recurring events established in 2009
International observances
LGBT awareness periods